William Ernest "Smiley" Adams (October 4, 1935 – June 19, 2003) was a trainer of Thoroughbred racehorses who trained Master Derby to win the 1975 Preakness Stakes, the second leg of the U.S. Triple Crown series. In what was the 100th running of the Preakness, Darrel McHargue aboard Master Derby defeated Kentucky Derby winner Foolish Pleasure by a full-length.

Always known as "Smiley", William Adams left school at age 14 to work as a stableboy at a racetrack. Three years later, the then 17-year-old lied about his age to join the United States Marine Corps and would serve overseas in the Korean War. After being discharged from the military, Adams returned to horse racing.

In addition to his success with Master Derby, Adams also notably trained Run Dusty Run who finished second in the 1977 Kentucky Derby, third in the 1977 Preakness Stakes and second in the 1977 Belmont Stakes, all to Triple Crown winner Seattle Slew. Among his many stakes wins, Smiley Adams won seven consecutive runnings of the Spiral Stakes at Latonia Race Course in Kentucky.

Smiley Adams was retired from training and living in Nicholasville, Kentucky at the time of his passing in 2003.

References

1935 births
2003 deaths
United States Marine Corps personnel of the Korean War
American horse trainers
People from Versailles, Kentucky
People from Nicholasville, Kentucky